Eutorna punctinigrella is a moth in the family Depressariidae. It was described by Pierre Viette in 1955. It is found on Madagascar.

References

Moths described in 1955
Eutorna